is a private junior college in Suita, Osaka, Japan.

History 
The college opened with a single academic department in April 1962. In April 1987, the second academic department was set up, but this was discontinued on May 31, 2009.

See also 
 List of junior colleges in Japan

References

External links 
  

Educational institutions established in 1962
Japanese junior colleges
1962 establishments in Japan
Universities and colleges in Osaka Prefecture
Private universities and colleges in Japan